The Tunjuelo or Tunjuelito River is a river on the Bogotá savanna and a left tributary of the Bogotá River. The river, with a length of  originates in the Sumapaz Páramo and flows northward through the Usme Synclinal to enter the Colombian capital Bogotá. There, the river is mostly canalised flowing westward into the Bogotá River. It is one of the three main rivers of the city, together with the Fucha and Juan Amarillo Rivers.

Etymology 
The names Tunjuelo and Tunjuelito ("little Tunjuelo") are derived from the Cerro de los Tunjos, also Los Tunjos Lake, named after the tunjos, the religious votive figurines of the indigenous language of the Muisca, who inhabited the Bogotá savanna before the Spanish conquest.

Description 

It flows through the southern part of the Colombian capital, south of the Fucha River, and has the largest drainage basin of the rivers of Bogotá. The river flows through the Usme Synclinal, where the type localities of various geological formations (among others the Marichuela Formation) are situated. The Tunjuelo River forms the border between the localities Usme and Ciudad Bolivar and between the namesake locality Tunjuelito and Ciudad Bolívar. The Tunjuelo River is highly contaminated.

Geology 

The Tunjuelo River valley hosts the type localities of various geologic formations of the Altiplano Cundiboyacense.

Wetlands 

Three of the fifteen protected wetlands of Bogotá are located in the Tunjuelo River basin.

Gallery

See also 

 List of rivers of Colombia
 Eastern Hills, Bogotá
 Bogotá savanna, Sumapaz Páramo
 Fucha River, Juan Amarillo River

References

Bibliography

Further reading

External links 

  Sistema Hídrico, Bogotá

Rivers of Colombia
Bogotá River
Geography of Cundinamarca Department
Geography of Bogotá
Rivers
Tunjuelo